Bare Necessities  is an American lingerie, swimwear, and loungewear online retailer which was established in 1998 in Avenel, New Jersey. The company claims to be the second largest online retailer in the industry next to Victoria's Secret with over $66 million in revenues.

In October 2018, Walmart acquired Bare Necessities, as part of its e-commerce strategy. In 2020, Walmart sold the company to Delta Galil Industries.

Company history
Bare Necessities was founded in Avenel, New Jersey in 1998 by two Carnegie-Mellon graduates, Noah Wrubel and Bill Richardson. Wrubel's family already operated several lingerie stores of the same name since 1965 throughout New Jersey. 

By 2006, the retailer set out to compete with Victoria's Secret with the help from Frog Design, A product design and branding firm best known for working with Apple. Their efforts paid off with consistent reported revenue increases and year over year growth. 

Bare Necessities was acquired by Walmart in 2018 as part of its strategy to compete with Amazon in the online clothing space. In 2020, Walmart sold the company to Israeli clothing company Delta Galil Industries. 

The company operates out of a 125,000 square-foot building in Edison, New Jersey, and employs about 200 people between the corporate staff and the on-site fulfillment center

Products 
The online retailer carries an array of brands such as Bali, Wacoal, SPANX, Calvin Klein, Hanky Panky, Chantelle, Freya, Panache, Hanro, La Perla, Le Mystere, Ugg Australia, Wolford, Hugo Boss, Armani, and Polo Ralph Lauren. The company also carries over 200 bra sizes ranging from 28 to 56 inch bands and from an AA cup to N Cup. Bare Necessities ships throughout the United States and worldwide.

Models 
Unlike most of the online retailers in the late 1990s, Bare Necessities always used models, instead of mannequins. Many of Bare Necessities' catalog models have become popular from the site. Many models have parlayed their e-commerce success by landing gigs with Sports Illustrated and Victoria's Secret. These models include:

Nina Agdal 
 Natasha Barnard
Brooklyn Decker 
Ashley Graham 
Jamie Gunns
Jarah Mariano
Juliana Martins
Catrinel Menghia
Lauren Mellor
Genevieve Morton
Sarah Mutch
Candice Swanepoel
Kate Upton
Alina Vacariu

References

Lingerie brands
Companies based in Middlesex County, New Jersey
American companies established in 1998
Clothing companies established in 1998
Retail companies established in 1998
Internet properties established in 1998
Swimwear manufacturers
1998 establishments in New Jersey
Lingerie retailers
Online clothing retailers of the United States
Economy of the Northeastern United States